Albert von Berrer was a Generalleutnant of Imperial German Army who was involved in World War I. He was killed in action in late 1917.

Life 
Albert von Berrer was born on 8 September 1857 in the Kingdom of Württemberg. He entered the 119th (1st Württemberg) Infantry Regiment in 1874, becoming a second lieutenant in 1876. During World war I, Berrer was the commander of 31st Infantry Division. His division belonged to Fritz von Below's XXI Corps and the 5th Army. He later was deployed on the Eastern Front. Eventually Berrer's corps was sent to the Italian Front as a part of Otto von Below's 14th Army. Berrer's unit pushed deep into the front and Berrer was awarded the Pour le Mérite on 27 August 1917. However, on 28 October 1917, Berrer was killed in action at San Gottardo when his staff car exceeded the front line. Shortly after entering the town San Gottardo in Italy, which seemed to be deserted, the car found itself being blocked by Italian soldiers.  Shocked driver stopped the car, and the Italian soldiers fired at the car, hitting the shoulder of Berrer.

References

1857 births
1917 deaths
People from the Kingdom of Württemberg
Lieutenant generals of Württemberg
Recipients of the Pour le Mérite (military class)
Recipients of the Iron Cross (1914), 1st class
German Army generals of World War I
German military personnel killed in World War I
People from Aalen
Military personnel from Baden-Württemberg